The Perseus–Pegasus Filament is a galaxy filament containing the Perseus–Pisces Supercluster and stretching for roughly a billion light-years (or over 300/h Mpc). Currently, it is considered to be one of the largest known structures in the universe. This filament is adjacent to the Pisces–Cetus Supercluster Complex.

Discovery
The Perseus–Pegasus Filament was discovered by David Batuski and Jack Burns of New Mexico State University in 1985.
It is likely that Clyde W. Tombaugh, of the Lowell Observatory, discovered its existence in 1936 while conducting his search for trans-Saturnian planets. He reported it as the Great Perseus-Andromeda stratum of Extra-Galactic Nebulae.

See also
 Abell catalogue
 Large-scale structure of the universe
 Supercluster

Notes

References

Galaxy filaments
Large-scale structure of the cosmos
Astronomical objects discovered in 1985